Adam Krupski (July 7, 1706 – March 8, 1748) was a professor of philosophy and Jesuit priest in the Grand Duchy of Lithuania. Legal expert in the legislation of the Grand Duchy of Lithuania, author of a school dialogue. His handwritten lectures on philosophy have survived. In his teaching activities, he adhered to the ideas of the Enlightenment.

Biography 
 July 14, 1723 – joined the Jesuit order in Vilnius. 
 In 1736–1737 – Professor of rhetoric at the Jesuit College in Polotsk (Belarus). 
 In 1737–1738 – Prefect of the school in Ilūkste (Latvia). 
 In 1740–1742 – Professor of philosophy at the Jesuit College in Kražiai (Lithuania). 
 In 1742–1746 – Procurator of the province of the Jesuit Order (Society of Jesus). 

References

Sources 

 (Belarusian) Вялікае княства Літоўскае: Энцыклапедыя / рэд. кал.: Г. П. Пашкоў (галоўны рэд.), Т. У. Бялова і інш. ; мастак З. Э. Герасімович. — 2-е выданне. — Мінск : Выд. «Беларуская Энцыклапедыя імя Пятруся Броўкі, 2005—2010. — Т. 1—3. — .— С. 285, Т. 3.
 (Lithuanian) Plečkaitis Romanas, «Lietuvos filosofijos istorija: Viduramžiai — Renesansas — Naujieji amžiai», 1 tomas, Kultūros, Filosofijos ir Meno Institutas, Vilnius, 2004. 
 (Polish) «Encyklopedia wiedzy o jezuitach na ziemiach Polski i Litwy 1564—1995», Oprac. Ludwik Grzebień i inni. — Kraków 2004. — S. 335.
 Poszakowski - s. 451
 Lit 65 f. 45 (nekr.)
 BUWiL 1229 (wyklady z filoz.)

External links 
 (Polish) Encyklopedia wiedzy o jezuitach na ziemiach Polski i Litwy, 1564—1995, Opracował Ludwik Grzebień SJ przy współpracy zespołu jezuitów, Wydz. Filozoficzny TJ, Kraków, 1996 s. XVI + 90 (in PDF, on the website «Ignatianum») 2004 r. — 880 s. — 

1706 births
1748 deaths
Christian philosophers
Belarusian Jesuits
Belarusian philosophers
18th-century Lithuanian Jesuits
18th-century Polish–Lithuanian philosophers
Roman Catholic monks